XS: The Opera Opus was a no wave avant-garde music and art performance created by Rhys Chatham and Joseph Nechvatal in the mid 1980s.  Jane Lawrence Smith sang the lead role in the Boston performance and Yves Musard danced the main role.  Its theme was the excess of the nuclear weapon buildup of the Ronald Reagan presidency.

XS: The Opera at Shakespeare Theatre, Boston
XS: The Opera, Shakespeare Theatre, Boston was the final production and consisted of three soprano singers, 4 trumpets, six electric guitars. bass, drums, 35 mm slide projection and dance. The duration was 90 minutes. Choreography: Yves Musard, 35 mm cross-fade art slides: Joseph Nechvatal

Musicians: Rhys Chatham (conductor) with Pamela Fleming, Steven Haynes, Ben Neill, James O'Connor, David Wonsey, Karen Haglof, Robert Poss, Mitch Salmon, Bill Brovold, Tim Schellenbaum, Conrad Kinard, J.P., Peggy Ackerman, Jane Lawrence Smith, Elly Spiegel.

Performance history

1986
XS: The Opera, Shakespeare Theatre, Boston
1985
XS: Night of Power, 8BC, New York, NY
XS: Night of Power: art installation, Quando, New York, NY
XS: art installation, Gray Art Gallery, East Carolina University
1984    
XS: The Opera Opus, Pyramid Club, New York, NY
XS: The Opera Opus, Club Danceteria,  New York, NY
XS: The Opera Opus, 8BC, New York, NY
XS: The Opera Opus, Elaine Dannheisser Foundation, New York, NY

See also 
Post-punk

Footnotes

References 
 audio excerpt from XS: The Opera Opus published at Tellus Audio Cassette Magazine
 #13 Power Electronics at Tellus Audio Cassette Magazine housed at UbuWeb
 XS: An Installation, Gray Art Gallery, East Carolina University, Greenville Catalogue
 Brooks, Rosetta, Interview-Rhys Chatham & Joseph Nechvatal, ZG, (#12 Fall)
 Kleyn, Robert, The Shadow Reflected, ZG (#12 Fall)
 Charlene Spretnak, The Spiritual Dynamic in Modern Art : Art History Reconsidered, 1800 to the Present, Palgrave Macmillan, (2014) p. 135
Die Donnergötter (LP, CD), Table of the Elements/Radium 2006 by Rhys Chatham
 containing:
 Die Donnergötter (1985/86)

Further reading  
Paula Court, New York Noise: Art and Music from the New York Underground 1978-88 (2007) Soul Jazz Records

Experimental music compositions
Noise music